Children of the revolution may refer to:

 Children of the revolution (concept)
 Children of the Revolution (song), a 1972 song by T. Rex
 Children of the Revolution (1996 film), a 1996 comedy film
 Children of the Revolution (2002 film), a 2002 film by Zola Maseko
Children of the Revolution (2010 film), a 2010 documentary film
 Children of the Revolution (novel), a 2013 novel by Peter Robinson